IF Urædd is a Norwegian sports club from Porsgrunn, founded in 1880. Since 8 December 1993 it has been an alliance sports team, with independent sections for football, handball, sport wrestling, skiing, gymnastics, basketball, athletics and speed skating.

Its football section Urædd FK, athletics section Urædd Friidrett and handball section Urædd Håndball are the best known nationwide.

Urædd Friidrett

Urædd Friidrett is the athletics department of the alliance club IF Urædd from Porsgrunn, which was founded in 1880. The athletics section within IF Urædd was established in 1917.

The athletics team uses the stadium Kjølnes stadion.

Its most prominent members are Lars Arvid Nilsen, Georg Andersen, Svein Inge Valvik and Olav Jenssen, who all competed in throwing events. Andersen and Nilsen originally won the silver and bronze medals in shot put at the 1991 World Championships in Athletics, but Andersen was disqualified and lost the medal due to a doping offence.

Urædd Fotball

The men's football team currently resides in the 3. divisjon, the fourth tier of Norwegian football, having won promotion after a brief stint of one season down in the 4. Divisjon in 2012. The club played in the Norwegian Cup final in 1904 as Porsgrunds FC and in 1911, which they lost 5-2 against Lyn.  Urædd's junior team for girls won the Telenor Cup, the national junior cup for Under-19 girls, in 2010, with a 4-1 win over Fløya in Tromsdalen.

Recent seasons (women's) 
{|class="wikitable"
|-bgcolor="#efefef"
! Season
! 
! Pos.
! Pl.
! W
! D
! L
! GS
! GA
! P
!Cup
!Notes
|-
|2014 
|1D
|align=right|3
|align=right|22||align=right|12||align=right|3||align=right|7
|align=right|44||align=right|27||align=right|39
||3rd round
|
|-
|2015 
|1D
|align=right bgcolor=#DDFFDD| 1
|align=right|22||align=right|17||align=right|2||align=right|3
|align=right|65||align=right|24||align=right|53
||2nd round
|Promoted to the Toppserien
|-
|2016 
|TS
|align=right bgcolor="#FFCCCC"| 12
|align=right|22||align=right|1||align=right|3||align=right|18
|align=right|12||align=right|72||align=right|6
||2nd round
|Relegated to the 1. divisjon
|-
|2017 
|1D
|align=right| 2
|align=right|22||align=right|12||align=right|5||align=right|5
|align=right|54||align=right|25||align=right|41
||2nd round
|
|-
|2018 
|1D
|align=right bgcolor="#FFCCCC"| 11
|align=right|22||align=right|5||align=right|7||align=right|10
|align=right|21||align=right|34||align=right|22
||1st round
|Relegated
|}

External links
 Official site 
 Official site - athletics section 

Football clubs in Norway
Athletics clubs in Norway
Sport in Porsgrunn
Sports clubs established in 1880
1880 establishments in Norway